Keresaspa may refer to:

Mythology
Kərəsāspa, the Avestan form of the name of Garshasp, a monster-slaying hero in Iranian mythology

Ships
USS Keresaspa (ID-1484), a United States Navy cargo ship in commission from 1918 to 1919